

Season 
2001–02 relegation brought Lecce in Serie B for an only year: Delio Rossi's team was unbeaten for 17 games, from 14 September 2002 to 18 January 2003 (including two initial matches, postponed due to lacking coverage of television rights). They came at third place, getting an immediate promotion.

Squad 
Squad at the end of the season.

Goalkeepers 
 Stephane Coque
 Antonio Rosati
 Generoso Rossi
 Vukasin Poleksic

Defenders 
 Philippe Billy
 Bruno Cirillo
 Nicolas Laspalles
 Erminio Rullo
 Gianluca Colonnello
 Alessandro Zoppetti
 Lorenzo Stovini
 Giuseppe Abruzzese
 Cristian Silvestri
 Cesare Bovo
 Arnaud Kouyo
 David Balleri

Midfielders 
 Drissa Diarra
 Cristian Antonio Agnelli
 Alessandro Conticchio
 Max Tonetto
 Guillermo Giacomazzi
 Djuric Winklaar
 Alfonso Camorani
 Rodolfo Giorgetti
 Luigi Piangerelli
 Giorgio Di Vicino
 Matteo Superbi
 Cristian Daniel Ledesma
 Marco Donadel

Attackers 
 Mirko Vučinić
 Valeri Bojinov
 Sebastjan Cimirotič
 Javier Chevantón
 Davor Vugrinec
 Alessandro Corallo
 Italo Mattioli
 Aldo Osorio
 Axel Cédric Konan

Manager 
 Delio Rossi

Serie B

League table

Results summary 

Updated to 7 June 2003.

Sources 
RSSF - Italy 2002/03

U.S. Lecce seasons
Lecce